Since its debut at the 2000 Summer Olympics, the triathlon has been planned for five different venues.

References

 
TRiath
Venues
Olympic venues